The 2020–21 New Mexico State Aggies men's basketball team represented New Mexico State University during the 2020–21 NCAA Division I men's basketball season. The Aggies were led by fourth-year head coach Chris Jans and were members of the Western Athletic Conference. Due to COVID-19 restrictions in the state of New Mexico, the Aggies did not play their home games at their normal home arena, the Pan American Center. Instead, they played their "home" games at various different locations, mainly in the Phoenix, Arizona area.

Previous season 
The Aggies finished the 2019–20 season 25–6, 16–0 in WAC play to win the WAC regular season championship. They were set to be the No. 1 seed in the WAC tournament, however, the tournament was cancelled amid the COVID-19 pandemic. Due to the WAC Tournament cancellation, they were awarded the WAC's automatic bid to the NCAA tournament. However, the NCAA Tournament was also cancelled due to the same outbreak.

Roster

Schedule and results

|-
!colspan=9 style=| Non-conference regular season

|-
!colspan=9 style=| WAC Regular Season

|-
!colspan=9 style=| WAC tournament

References

New Mexico State Aggies men's basketball seasons
New Mexico State
New Mexico State Aggies men's basketball
New Mexico State Aggies men's basketball